Yossi Malka, is an Israeli former footballer who played for Maccabi Netanya.

He is of a Tunisian-Jewish descent.

Honours
Second Division
1998–99

References

1974 births
Living people
Israeli Jews
Israeli footballers
Maccabi Netanya F.C. players
Hapoel Haifa F.C. players
Maccabi Ironi Ashdod F.C. players
Maccabi Ironi Kiryat Ata F.C. players
Liga Leumit players
Israeli Premier League players
Israeli people of Tunisian-Jewish descent
Association football defenders